Krasny Klin is a rural locality (a village) in Zelenoklinovsky Selsoviet, Alsheyevsky District, Bashkortostan, Russia. The population was 238 as of 2010. There are 2 streets.

Geography 
Krasny Klin is located 36 km southeast of Rayevsky (the district's administrative centre) by road. Abdulkarimovo is the nearest rural locality.

References 

Rural localities in Alsheyevsky District